Centro de Convenciones Agua Viva (formerly known as Coliseo Amauta) is the biggest multi-use indoor arena in Peru, located in the southern zone of the Lima District in Lima, Peru. The arena has a capacity for 20,000 people, which can vary depending on use. It originally opened in 1946. 

It is the largest covered arena in Peru, today it is being renovated by its current owner, Agua Viva Church.  In the past it hosted events such as a Soda Stereo concert in 1987, and it was the home of the children's TV program Nubeluz, who used the arena for the broadcasting of the show until 1995 when they moved to Panamericana Television studios in Santa Beatriz.

Events
The arena hosts sport events as basketball and volleyball. Today it is used for evangelic events and church services on Sunday.

In 1982, Amauta Coliseum was the site of three big events including the Miss Universe 1982 on July 26; the Women's World Championship of Volleyball, from September 12 to September 25); and the OTI Song Contest, on November 27.

Concerts
Indochine played 4 nights in April and May 1988 in front of 48,000 people
Soda Stéreo
Menudo
Arena Hash

References

External links

Sports venues in Lima
Event venues established in 1968
Indoor arenas in Peru